The Communauté d'agglomération Paris-Saclay (or CPS) is an administrative entity in the Essonne département, near Paris. The administrative center is Orsay. It was formed on 1 January 2016 by the merger of the former Communauté d'agglomération du Plateau de Saclay (CAPS) and the Communauté d'agglomération Europ'Essonne(E²). Its area is 185.9 km2. Its population was 314,169 in 2018.

Geography

Location
The Communauté d'Agglomération Paris-Saclay is located at the north-west of the département of Essonne, on the plateau de Saclay. 
The altitude is between 47m (154') in Palaiseau and 172m (564') in Gif-sur-Yvette.

Communes
The Communauté d'Agglomération Paris-Saclay consists of the following communes:

Ballainvilliers
Bures-sur-Yvette
Champlan
Chilly-Mazarin
Épinay-sur-Orge
Gif-sur-Yvette
Gometz-le-Châtel
Igny
Linas
Longjumeau
Marcoussis
Massy
Montlhéry
Nozay
Orsay
Palaiseau
Saclay
Saint-Aubin
Saulx-les-Chartreux
Les Ulis
Vauhallan
Verrières-le-Buisson
Villebon-sur-Yvette
La Ville-du-Bois
Villejust
Villiers-le-Bâcle
Wissous

History
 At first, the syndicat intercommunal du plateau de Saclay (SIPS) was founded in 1988.
 The 6 December 1991, it became the district du plateau de Saclay (DIPS).
 It became a Communauté de communes then, in 2002, a Communauté d'agglomération.
 Before, communes of Bièvres in Essonne, Buc, Châteaufort, Jouy-en-Josas and Les Loges-en-Josas in Yvelines was in the district.
 In 2004, Gometz-le-Châtel integrates the CAPS.
 In 2010, the CAPS adheres at the syndicat mixte Paris Métropole.

Transportation

Mass transit 
Passenger rail service is provided in the community by RATP and Transilien SNCF in several RER stations in the Paris-Saclay University campus :

 Orsay-Ville station, RER B;
 Massy-Palaiseau station, RER B & C;
 Jouy-en-Josas station (HEC Paris), RER C and future T12;
 Lozère - École Polytechnique station, RER B;

And more in the Paris-Saclay and Versailles research campus :

 Saint-Quentin-en-Yvelines station, RER C and Transilien line N and line U;
 Versailles-Chantiers station, RER C and TER services.

Rail 
The Paris-Saclay community has the LGV Atlantique high-speed rail line serving the Massy TGV station.

Buses 
Transports in the Paris-Saclay community is managed by Paris-Saclay Mobilités and provided by Transdev and Keolis.

Long-distance bus service is provided by BlaBlaBus and Flixbus at Massy-Palaiseau RER and SNCF TGV station.

References

External links
 Official Website

Paris-Saclay
Paris-Saclay
Paris-Saclay